The Papists Act 1688 (1 Will. & Mar., c. 9) was an Act of Parliament passed by the Parliament of England during the Glorious Revolution. Its full title was "An Act for the Amoving Papists and reputed Papists from the Cityes of London and Westminster and Ten Miles distance from the same".

Notes

Acts of the Parliament of England
1688 in law